The Auburn University Chapel is the second-oldest building and oldest building in its original location on the campus of Auburn University in Auburn, Alabama.

History
The chapel was built in 1851 as a Presbyterian church in the Greek Revival style.  During the Civil War, the building briefly served as a Confederate hospital for wounded soldiers, and later in the century was temporarily divided into classrooms when the main building of the nearby Alabama Agricultural and Mechanical College burned in 1887.

Around 1900, the church was renovated in a Gothic style.  The building was sold to the college in 1921, where it became the YMCA/YWCA center for a few years.  From 1927 to 1973, it housed the Auburn Players Theater, the college's acting troupe.  Between 1973 and 1976, the structure underwent a significant renovation for conversion to the Auburn University Chapel, an interdenominational, multipurpose building, a function it still serves today.  The building was added to the National Register of Historic Places as Auburn Players Theater on May 22, 1973.

References

Historic Chattahoochee Commission and Auburn Heritage Association (1994). Auburn University Chapel.  Historic Marker.  Located 139 South College Street, Auburn, Ala.
Logue, Mickey & Simms, Jack (1996). Auburn:  A Pictorial History of the Loveliest Village, Revised.  Auburn, Ala. 
Windham, Kathryn Tucker (1982).  Jeffrey's Latest 13: More Alabama Ghosts.  Tuscaloosa, Ala., University of Alabama Press.

External links

Auburn University Chapel 
Auburn University Chapel Floorplan
Auburn University Theatre

Buildings and structures in Auburn, Alabama
Auburn University
Properties of religious function on the National Register of Historic Places in Alabama
Churches in Lee County, Alabama
American Civil War hospitals
Churches completed in 1851
19th-century churches in the United States
Gothic Revival church buildings in Alabama
National Register of Historic Places in Lee County, Alabama
University and college buildings on the National Register of Historic Places in Alabama
1851 establishments in Alabama
University and college chapels in the United States
University and college buildings completed in 1851